John Kitchener Furniss (11 December 1914 – 15 February 2003) was an Australian rules footballer who played with Melbourne in the Victorian Football League (VFL).

Furniss was born in Boolarra and played his early football at Glen Iris. He was a follower in Melbourne's 1939 premiership side. The following year he appeared in Melbourne's preliminary final win but injury cost him a spot in their premiership team.

He served with the Royal Australian Air Force during World War II. Although his RAAF commitments kept him out of the VFL, he did however play in Canberra, for the Fairbairn club. He won his league's best and fairest award, the Mulrooney Medal, in 1941.

In 1947 he returned to the VFL after a seven-year absence and played two senior games for Melbourne.

Footnotes

References
 Second World War Nominal Roll: Leading Aircraftman John Kitchener Furniss (400002), Commonwealth of Australia.
 Second World War Service Record: Leading Aircraftman John Kitchener Furniss (400002), National Archives of Australia.

External links
 AFL Tables: Jack Furniss.
 Jack Furniss: Boyles Football Photos.
 Jack Furniss: Demonwiki.

1914 births
Australian rules footballers from Victoria (Australia)
Melbourne Football Club players
Royal Australian Air Force personnel of World War II
2003 deaths
Melbourne Football Club Premiership players
One-time VFL/AFL Premiership players
Military personnel from Victoria (Australia)